I52 or I-52 may refer to:

 , a destroyer in service with the Royal Navy from 1940 to 1942
 , several ships of the Imperial Japanese Navy
 I-52-class submarine, of the Imperial Japanese Navy
 I-52 Mine layer vehicle, from Ukraine